Christian III, Count of Oldenburg (first attested in 12691285) was a ruling Count of Oldenburg. His parents were John I of Oldenburg and Richeza (or Rixa) of Hoya-Stumpenhausen.

Life 
From 1272, his brother Otto II appears as co-ruler.

During the early years of his reign, the ministeriales, led by the Knight Robert von Westerholt, revolted.  The rebels managed to invade the city of Oldenburg.  Christian, who was still defending Oldenburg Castle, set the city on fire, so that the attackers were left with neither food nor shelter, and had to withdraw.  Christian pursued them, and decisively defeated them in the Battle of the Tungeler Marsh.  Robert von Westerholt and other rebellious noblemen were taken prisoner.  The chronicle of Rasted describes his victory in great detail.

In contemporary sources, Christian is described as peace-loving ("... the peasants lived in peace and complete tranquility") and friendly towards the church.  He was pious and also knew how to enjoy life ("... loved a good wine").

He married Jutta of Bentheim and had three sons. His oldest son, John II succeeded in 1285 as Count of Oldenburg; Otto became Archbishop of Bremen in 1344.

See also 
 List of rulers of Oldenburg

References 
 Hans Friedl, Wolfgang Günther, Hilke Günther-Arndt, and Heinrich Schmidt (eds.): Biographisches Handbuch zur Geschichte des Landes Oldenburg, Oldenburg 1992, 
 Hermann Lübbing: Die Rasteder Chronik 1059-1477, Oldenburg, 1976, 

Counts of Oldenburg
13th-century births
Year of birth unknown
1285 deaths
13th-century German nobility